Loubna Benhadja (born 11 February 2001) is an Algerian athlete. She competed in the women's 400 metres hurdles event at the 2020 Summer Olympics.

References

External links
 

2001 births
Living people
Algerian female hurdlers
Athletes (track and field) at the 2020 Summer Olympics
Olympic athletes of Algeria
People from Blida
African Games competitors for Algeria
Athletes (track and field) at the 2019 African Games
Athletes (track and field) at the 2018 Summer Youth Olympics
Athletes (track and field) at the 2018 African Youth Games
21st-century Algerian women